The Orange Leader may refer to:

 The Orange Leader (Texas), a newspaper in the United States
 The Orange Leader (New South Wales), a defunct newspaper of Australia